Roger Andrew Bowles (born 1 February 1936) is an English former first-class cricketer.

Born at Carshalton in February 1936, Bowles attended Brasenose College, Oxford. While studying at Oxford, he made three appearances in first-class cricket for Oxford University in 1957, against Worcestershire, the Free Foresters and Leicestershire. He scored a total of 92 runs at an average of 15.33 in these three matches, with a high score of 43.

References

External links

1936 births
Living people
Cricketers from Carshalton
Alumni of Brasenose College, Oxford
English cricketers
Oxford University cricketers